The following people have been identified as victims of the News International phone hacking scandal.

The victims of the phone hacking fall broadly into three categories, as identified by Nick Davies writing in the Guardian :

First, there are those people who have been approached and warned by The Scotland Yard that there was hard evidence of their voicemail being accessed without authority. Some were warned at the time of the original inquiry in 2006. Others were warned only after the Guardian revived the story in July 2009. Scotland Yard refuse to say how many were warned at either time. They have said that they also approached and warned people in four 'national security' categories if there was reasonable grounds to suspect that their voicemail might have been accessed without authority - members of the royal household, the military, the police and the government. But here again, they refuse to say how many people they warned in each of those categories.

Second, there are those who have taken the initiative to approach Scotland Yard and to ask whether the police hold any evidence that they were targeted in any way by Mulcaire. Scotland Yard are holding the results of an analysis of phone records which, we now know, revealed "a vast number" of people who had had their voicemail accessed; and also a spreadsheet which summarises the contents of the mass of paperwork, audio tapes and computer records which police seized from Mulcaire and which, the Guardian discovered, included 4,332 names or partial names; 2,987 mobile phone numbers; 30 audio tapes of varying length; and 91 PIN codes of a kind which are needed to access voicemail with the minority of targets who change the factory settings on their mobile phones.

Third, there are 120 people who were identified by three mobile phone companies who followed up on Scotland Yard's original investigation and found that some of their users had had their voicemail accessed from numbers used by Glenn Mulcaire. Orange say they warned none of those whom they identified; Vodafone say they warned customers 'as appropriate'; O2 say they warned all of their customers whom they identified.

Six unnamed journalists working for the Mail on Sunday/Daily Mail have been warned by the police that their name and/or other details are included in evidence held by the police.

In addition to the people already identified as victims, a number of people have approached the police to say that they believe their phone was hacked by the News of the World.

Actress Leslie Ash and her husband, former footballer Lee Chapman, have announced that they are considering legal action against the NOTW over suspicions that their voicemails, and those of their children, were eavesdropped in 2006.
Alastair Campbell, Tony Blair's former communications director, believes his phone was hacked in 2003.
Lawyers acting for RMT trade union leader Bob Crow have written to the Metropolitan Police asking for any evidence or information that they may have uncovered in respect of NOTW. Crow has suspicions that "journalists may have had access to private information about my movements and my union's activities that date back to the year 2000".
The interior designer Kelly Hoppen has lodged a claim against the NOTW and one of its reporters, Dan Evans, for "accessing or attempting to access her voicemail messages between June 2009 and March 2010".

See also

 CTB v News Group Newspapers
 Mosley v News Group Newspapers Limited
 Sheridan v News International

References

Phone hacking victims list from the Guardian

2011 in law
2011 in the United Kingdom
British journalism
Disappearance of Madeleine McCann

Political scandals in the United Kingdom